Vanduin Batbayar (born 25 December 1950) is a Mongolian boxer. He competed in the men's light flyweight event at the 1972 Summer Olympics. At the 1972 Summer Olympics, he lost to Héctor Velásquez of Chile.

References

External links
 

1950 births
Living people
Mongolian male boxers
Olympic boxers of Mongolia
Boxers at the 1972 Summer Olympics
Place of birth missing (living people)
Light-flyweight boxers
20th-century Mongolian people